Steinbach is a small river of Hesse, Germany. It is a right tributary of the Nidda in Praunheim.

See also
List of rivers of Hesse

Rivers of Hesse
Rivers of Germany